Isopropylmethylpyrazolyl dimethylcarbamate is a chemical compound used in Europe in aphicides and insecticides. As of 1998, the United States Environmental Protection Agency listed it as an unregistered pesticide in the United States. In China, it is used under the name isolan.

It is classified as an extremely hazardous substance in the United States as defined in Section 302 of the U.S. Emergency Planning and Community Right-to-Know Act (42 U.S.C. 11002), and is subject to strict reporting requirements by facilities which produce, store, or use it in significant quantities.

References

Carbamates
Insecticides
Pyrazoles
Isopropyl compounds